Oswichee Creek is a stream in the U.S. state of Georgia.  It is a tributary to the Chattahoochee River.

Oswichee was the name of a tribe of the indigenous peoples of the Southeastern Woodlands. A variant spelling is "Oswitchee Creek".

References

Rivers of Georgia (U.S. state)
Rivers of Chattahoochee County, Georgia